Landscape with the Fall of Icarus is an oil on canvas painting by Flemish painter Joos de Momper. It was possibly painted in the 1620s, and is currently housed at the Nationalmuseum in Stockholm.

Subject
In Greek mythology, Icarus succeeded in flying, while attempting to escape from Crete, with wings made by his father Daedalus, using feathers secured with beeswax. Dedalus asked icarus to fly neither too low nor too high, warning him of hubris. Ignoring his father's warnings, Icarus chose to fly too close to the sun, melting the wax. He fell into the sea and drowned.

Painting
To the left, several ships are sailing, coasting steep cliffs. Tall and leafy trees frame the painting to the right; a seaside town stretches in the middle, overhung by fabulous cliffs, which are typical of de Momper and his group of Flemish landscapists.

In the trees' shadow there sits a shepherd, tending to his flock. There is a fisherman to the left, and a ploughman on their right. These three figures (ploughman, shepherd and angler) are mentioned in Ovid's account of the legend. In the Roman poet's version, they are: "astonished and think to see gods approaching them through the aether." In contrast to this, there is a Flemish proverb that goes "And the farmer continued to plough..." (En de boer ... hij ploegde voort) pointing out the ignorance of people to fellow men's suffering. The painting was inspired by Bruegel's oeuvre of the same name. In de Momper's version, too, the three figures appear to pay no attention to flying men, mistakable for gods. As regards Bruegel's painting, it has been suggested by W. H. Auden in his 1938 poem, that it depicts humankind's indifference to suffering by highlighting the ordinary events which continue to occur, despite the unobserved death of Icarus.

The painting was taken to Stockholm as booty in 1648.

References

Further reading
 Cavalli-Björkman 1986 , p. 90-91 , met afb. en opgave van herkomst en literatuur

External links
Painting at the Netherlands Institute for Art History

1620s paintings
Landscape paintings
Paintings by Joos de Momper
Paintings in Sweden
Paintings in the collection of the Nationalmuseum Stockholm
Paintings based on Metamorphoses